Rubico may refer to:
 Rubicon, river in Italy, famous for Julius Caesar "crossing the Rubicon"
 Green clay, tennis court surface
 "Rubico", alias of David Kernell, who perpetrated the Sarah Palin email hack

See also
 Rubicon (disambiguation)